Kristy is a female given name of Latin origin, which means "follower of Christ". The name is a variant of Kristi, Kristin, Kristina, and Kristine. Notable people with the name include:

Kristy Cates (born 1977), American actress
Kristy Lee Cook (born 1984), American singer 
Kristy Curry (born 1966), American basketball coach
Kristy Hanson (born 1981), American singer-songwriter
Kristy Hawkins (born 1980), American bodybuilder
Kirsty Jones (died 2000), British female murder victim
Kristy Kowal (born 1978), American swimmer
Kristy McNichol (born 1962), American actress 
Kristy McPherson (born 1981), American golfer
Kristy Moore (born 1977), Australian football player
Kristy Sargeant (born 1974), Canadian skater
Kristy Swanson (born 1969), American actress
Kristy Wright (born 1978), Australian actress
Kristy Wu (born 1982), American actress
Kristy Yang (born 1974), Canadian actress

See also
Christy
Kristi
Kristy (film)
Kristy (village), Slovakia
Hurricane Kristy

English feminine given names
English given names